G̃ / g̃ is a letter which combines the common letter G with a tilde.

The letter does not exist in many alphabets.  Examples of alphabets with this letter are:

 Filipino alphabet – during the Spanish colonial period and up to the mid-20th century, adopting Spanish orthography for the Tagalog language
 Sumerian language – an extinct language, where it is used to transcribe the cuneiform script.
 Northern Sami orthography – g̃ appears in the Sami alphabet used by Rask in Ræsonneret lappisk sproglære in 1832

Computer encoding 
Unicode encodes g with tilde with a combining diacritical mark, rather than a precomposed character. As such, the tilde may not align properly with some typefaces and systems. Additionally, owing to the difficulties in inputting this character, Guarani speakers often replace it with g with circumflex (ĝ) or omit the diacritic altogether.

References 

Latin letters with diacritics